Andrew J. Horne is an attorney, former political candidate, and a retired United States Marine Corps Reserves Lieutenant Colonel from Louisville, Kentucky who served in the Persian Gulf War and the Iraq War. Initially he tentatively supported the 2003 invasion of Iraq but revised his stance on the matter, stating "Iraq is a symptom of what's wrong with this [the Bush] Administration."  He filed to run for the Democratic Party's nomination for U.S. Senate in Kentucky, but dropped out of the race two weeks after filing.

Biography
Growing up, Horne began working by mowing grass in neighborhoods, delivering newspapers such as the Courier Journal and Louisville Times, working on an organic farm, and working in his family's local laundry cleaners. Horne was also a Boy Scout during his juvenile years. Andrew Horne attended Pleasure Ridge Park High School and enlisted in the Marine Reserves before graduating in 1979. He served his boot camp at Parris Island and then returned home to be accepted in a Platoon Leaders course.

Horne graduated from the University of Louisville in 1983. While attending the school he was accepted as to the fraternity of Phi Kappa Tau which has famous alumni such as actor Paul Newman and Senator Mitch McConnell. He was the first member of his family to graduate college.

Returning in 1989 to the University of Louisville's Louis D. Brandeis School of Law and graduating in 1993. Andrew Horne is co-owner if the Anderson & Horne, PLLC. Horne took a brief leave during Operation Desert Storm but when he returned and finished his degree in law and he was awarded Leon Seidman Memorial Award. Also during his tenure at the school for his law studies he met his wife Stephanie.

Horne would then serve in Operation Iraqi Freedom, operating in Iraq for a second time before returning home and having an unsuccessful bid for Congress in 2006. Horne has continued operating his law practice as well as participating in several legal and charitable associations.

Senatorial candidate

The "Draft Horne for Senate" movement officially launched August 15, 2007. This was a grassroots effort to convince Horne to run against Republican Senator Mitch McConnell.  This effort proved fruitful, as on December 13, 2007, via the Kentucky-based Page One blog, Horne announced his candidacy via YouTube video for the Democratic nomination for U.S. Senate. Horne has continued a television campaign with promises of securing medical research funding for Kentucky Universities.

In a December 14 article in the Louisville Courier-Journal Horne was quoted saying:

He has focused efforts towards Republican incumbent Mitch McConnell while facing two millionaires, Greg Fischer (CEO of Dant Clayton) and Bruce Lunsford in the Democratic Primary. Fischer has talked to current Governor Steve Beshear about his campaign, which Beshear has mentioned previously that he plans on supporting the Democrat nomination following the primary.

He dropped out of the race on February 12, 2008. Although he declined to give a reason initially, the Courier-Journal reported his campaign was unhappy the Democratic Senatorial Campaign Committee was supporting Lunsford.

Congressional candidate
In 2006, Horne was a candidate for the Democratic nomination for Kentucky's 3rd congressional district seat. According to the Louisville Courier Journal, Horne declared his candidacy on December 14, 2005, and was subsequently endorsed by Ohio politician, Iraq War veteran and former United States Senate candidate Paul Hackett. He would then go on to receive endorsements from former congressional district 3 seat holder Mike Ward and General Wesley Clark.

Andrew Horne covered some controversial issues such as criticism of President George W. Bush over the Iraq war, criticism of the Louisville Gas & Electric plant in Trimble County, Kentucky regarding hiring workers locally, and calling for Republican Anne Northup to return campaign funds received from Tom DeLay. Horne's campaign addressed several concerns from health care to the Ohio River Bridges Project in addition to the more controversial topics.

Horne lost to John Yarmuth in the Democratic Primary on May 16, 2006.  Yarmuth went on to defeat the incumbent Republican Anne Northup.

Other political activity
On March 31, 2007, Horne was chosen to deliver the Democrats' weekly radio address. He spoke on the issue of the H.R. 1591  : "Making emergency supplemental appropriations for the fiscal year ending September 30, 2007, and for other purposes".

Horne was on the Board of Advisors for VoteVets.org, but resigned upon the announcement of his run for the Senate.

See also

References

External links
Anderson and Horne, PLLC
Andrew Horne Homepage
Andrew Horne for Senate official campaign website
Andrew Horne's video announcement of candidacy for the U.S. Senate on the Page One blog
Draft Andrew Horne for U.S. Senate
2006 official campaign website
 https://web.archive.org/web/20070311214233/http://securingamerica.com/ccn/node/3800
 https://web.archive.org/web/20060206160325/http://www.bandofbrothers2006.org/
 https://web.archive.org/web/20060615032249/http://vetpac.org/

Living people
Year of birth missing (living people)
United States Marine Corps personnel of the Iraq War
Lawyers from Louisville, Kentucky
University of Louisville alumni
United States Marine Corps officers
United States Marine Corps reservists
Pleasure Ridge Park High School alumni